HMS Scythian was a S-class submarine of the third batch built for the Royal Navy during World War II. She survived the war and was sold for scrap in 1960.

Design and description
The third batch was slightly enlarged and improved over the preceding second batch of the S-class. They displaced  on the surface and  submerged. The S-class submarines had a crew of 48 officers and ratings.

For surface running, the boats were powered by two  diesel engines, each driving one propeller shaft. When submerged each propeller was driven by a  electric motor. They could reach  on the surface and  underwater.

Scythian was armed with six 21 inch (533 mm) torpedo tubes in the bow. She carried six reload torpedoes for a total of a dozen torpedoes. Twelve mines could be carried in lieu of the torpedoes. The boat was also equipped with a 4-inch (102 mm) deck gun and a  Oerlikon AA gun.

Construction and career
HMS Scythian built by Scotts, of Greenock and launched on 14 April 1944. Thus far she has been the only ship of the Royal Navy to bear the name Scythian. Built as the Second World War was drawing to a close, she did not see much action, spending the period between March and May 1945 on the eastern station.  Here, she managed to sink nine Japanese sailing vessels and a small unidentified
Japanese vessel.

Along with her sisters, Scorcher and Sirdar, Scythian took part in the search for the missing HMS Affray in 1951. Scythian was paid off and arrived at Charlestown on 8 August 1960 for breaking up.

Notes

References
 
  
 
 
 

 

British S-class submarines (1931)
1944 ships
World War II submarines of the United Kingdom
Royal Navy ship names